John Maxwell Collie (21 February 1931 – 6 January 2018) was an Australian trombonist who plays Dixieland. Born in Melbourne, Australia, he played with several different jazz band before forming his own group, Max Collie's Rhythm Aces, in February 1966.1 They released their first record in 1971 and, in 1975, won a world championship in traditional jazz against 14 North American jazz band.

Collie died in January 2018, at the age of 86.

References

External links
 Max Collie at AllMusic

1931 births
2018 deaths
Australian musicians
Australian trombonists
Black Lion Records artists
Musicians from Melbourne